Portland Penny Diner was a restaurant in Portland, Oregon's Hotel Lucia, in the United States.

Description

Portland Penny Diner was a diner at the intersection of Southwest Broadway and Stark Street (since renamed Harvey Milk Street) in downtown Portland, owned by restaurateur Vitaly Paley. Housed within the Hotel Lucia, the exterior had a sign with a spinning penny. In 2016, Willamette Week Enid Spitz described the restaurant as a "modern, subway-tiled diner" with "pared-down breakfasts for prices cheaper than many food carts".

History
The restaurant opened in November 2012.

The diner closed in May 2017, replaced by Paley's pizza bar and restaurant called The Crown at Imperial.

See also
 List of defunct restaurants of the United States
 List of diners

References

External links

 Portland Penny Diner at Zomato

2012 establishments in Oregon
2017 disestablishments in Oregon
Defunct restaurants in Portland, Oregon
Diners in Portland, Oregon
Restaurants disestablished in 2017
Restaurants established in 2012
Southwest Portland, Oregon